John Spurley Challis (16 August 1942 – 19 September 2021) was an English actor. He had an extensive theatre and television career but is best known for portraying Terrance Aubrey "Boycie" Boyce in the long-running BBC Television sitcom Only Fools and Horses (1981–2003) and its sequel/spin-off The Green Green Grass (2005–2009), as well as Monty Staines from the seventh series onwards in the ITV sitcom Benidorm (2015–2018). Challis was an established stage actor, making appearances for companies including the Royal Shakespeare Company and the National Theatre.

Early life 
John Spurley Challis was born on 16 August 1942 in Clifton, Bristol, England. An only child, his family moved to Southeast London when he was one year old. He grew up in Epsom, after the family moved to Surrey. Challis attended the state boarding Ottershaw School near Woking, Surrey. His father was Alec, a civil servant with the Admiralty who became secretary to the energy minister; he was a strict disciplinarian. His mother was Joan (née Harden), a former ambulance driver who performed in amateur dramatics and taught drama in schools.

After leaving school, he worked as a trainee estate agent, before he "ran away with the Argyle Theatre for Youth".

Career

Television and radio

His first television role was in the BBC soap opera The Newcomers in 1967. Another early television role, also in 1967 was as a thief who stole Ena Sharples' handbag in Coronation Street; he would later have a recurring role in the series as Detective Sergeant Norman Phillips from 1975 to 1977. 1969 he played in the gangster drama Big Breadwinner Hog, and between 1971 and 1975 Challis made regular appearances in Z-Cars as Sergeant Culshaw.

The sitcom Bloomers (1979), starring Richard Beckinsale, was written about Challis's experience working at a garden centre while taking a break from acting.

A role in the John Sullivan sitcom Citizen Smith led to Challis being cast as Terrance Aubrey "Boycie" Boyce in Only Fools and Horses (1981—2003), which became his best-known role. Sullivan also created a spin-off for Challis, The Green Green Grass (2005—2009). The outdoor scenes of The Green Green Grass were filmed at his then-home at Wigmore Abbey, surrounding fields and local villages.

His other television appearances include Dixon of Dock Green, Thriller, The Sweeney, Doctor Who (The Seeds of Doom), Dracula, Beau Geste, Juliet Bravo,  Bloomers, Ever Decreasing Circles, Doctor Snuggles, Chance in a Million, The Bill, One Foot in the Grave, Open All Hours, The New Statesman, Don't Wait Up, Soldier Soldier, Brass Eye, My Family, In Sickness and in Health, Benidorm and Heartbeat. During his appearance in a 1997 Channel 4 mockumentary Brass Eye television episode "Decline", he was tricked into believing Clive Anderson had been shot by Noel Edmonds. In 2006 he took a cameo role in BBC's The Impressionists as the stationmaster at the Gare Saint Lazare. In the 2008 episode "Is Jeremy Quite Safe?" of Last of the Summer Wine he guest-starred as a retired jewel thief with fanciful stories of his past exploits in the South of France. In 2012, he narrated the National Geographic Channel series Strippers: Cars for Cash.

On BBC radio, he played an interrogator in the play Rules of Asylum by James Follett, broadcast by BBC Radio 4 in 1973. He also played Dibden Purlew in Getting Nowhere Fast from 2001 to 2004.

He became an honorary citizen of Serbia, where Only Fools and Horses remains hugely popular. In 2020, Challis made the documentary Boycie in Belgrade, exploring why the show was so beloved in the Balkan country.

Theatre
Challis performed many stage roles, including with the Royal Shakespeare Company in the 1960s and the National Theatre. His first performance in London's West End was in Portrait of a Queen in 1965 at the Vaudeville Theatre. In 1977 he played a leading role at the Orange Tree Theatre in Richmond, in Sam Walters’ production of Václav Havel’s play The Memorandum.
In 1979 he went on tour of the US with  Tom Stoppard's play Cahoot’s Macbeth.

His work at the National Theatre included productions of On the Razzle (1979) and The Rivals (1983), with Michael Hordern, and Laughter on the 23rd Floor with Frank Finlay. In a 1993 tour with the National he starred along with Barbara Windsor, Kenneth Waller, and Christopher Villiers in a production of Entertaining Mr Sloane by Joe Orton. He appeared with Sue Holderness ('Marlene' in Only Fools and Horses) in Ayckbourn's Relatively Speaking, Time and Time Again and How the Other Half Loves, and the National Theatre's own production of Boycie and Marlene.

In 1995, at the height of the success of Only Fools and Horses, as an established Shakespeare actor he returned to the stage to appear in Richard III and A Midsummer Night’s Dream at Regent’s Park Open Air Theatre, and in 2000 he played Malvolio in Twelfth Night, at Stafford Castle and he performed at Ludlow Castle in As You Like It  in 2011.

He was also featured regularly in pantomime productions in which he usually played the roguish or wicked roles, such as for example,  Captain Hook in Peter Pan at the Plaza Theatre, Stockport, a role he reprised in 2018 at the Theatre Royal, Nottingham. He also appeared in pantomime at Weston Playhouse in winter 2011–12 playing Ebenezer in Aladdin and as King Rat in Dick Whittington at the Plaza over Christmas 2013 and New Year 2014.

 In 2013, Challis occasionally contributed to the Hitchhiker's Guide to the Galaxy Live Tour as the narrator. In 2014, he began a theatre tour of his one-man show titled Only Fools and Boycie, which charted his life before, during and after his time as Boycie.

Personal life and death

Challis was married four times. His first wife, Jean Robertson, was a stage manager. His second and third wives were actresses Debbie Arnold and Sabina Franklyn. He married his fourth wife Carol Davies in Brighton in 1995 and in 1998 bought the Abbot's Lodgings at Wigmore Abbey Grange, Adforton, Herefordshire, which they proceeded to renovate. Challis had no children.

Challis was a patron of the British Hedgehog Preservation Society. He was an Arsenal supporter. Challis wrote two volumes of autobiography, Being Boycie and Boycie & Beyond. In 2016, he wrote Wigmore Abbey: The Treasure of Mortimer about the renovation of his house's gardens.

Challis additionally was a patron and avid supporter of "The Rose Theatre" in Kidderminster, Worcestershire. The organisation also paid special tribute to Challis after his death.

Through Twitter, Challis became friends with American actor and musician Ice-T, with the pair exchanging gifts although never meeting in person.

Challis died of cancer in his sleep on 19 September 2021, aged 79. He had been diagnosed with the disease in 2019.

Tributes were paid by a number of fellow actors and entertainers including his Only Fools and Horses co-stars Sir David Jason and Sue Holderness, as well as Ice-T, Paul Chuckle, Piers Morgan and Sheila Ferguson.

Challis was an avid supporter of Arsenal Football Club and the club paid tribute to him following his death.

Filmography

Film

Television

Books 
 2011, Being Boycie, Wigmore Books Ltd., 
 2012, Boycie & Beyond, Wigmore Books Ltd., 
 2016, Wigmore Abbey: The Treasure of Mortimer, (photography by Alex Ramsey), Wigmore Books Ltd.,

References

External links

 
 
 

1942 births
2021 deaths
Deaths from cancer in England
People from Clifton, Bristol
20th-century English male actors
21st-century English male actors
British male comedy actors
English male Shakespearean actors
English male stage actors
English male television actors
Male actors from Bristol
Royal Shakespeare Company members